Pieter Brueghel (also Bruegel or Breughel)  the Younger (between 23 May and 10 October 1564 – between March and May 1638) was a Flemish painter, known for numerous copies after his father Pieter Bruegel the Elder's work as well as his original compositions.  The large output of his studio, which produced for the local and export market, contributed to the international spread of his father's imagery.

Traditionally Pieter Brueghel the Younger has been nicknamed "de helse Brueghel" or "Hell Brueghel" because it was believed he was the author of several paintings with fantastic depictions of fire and grotesque imagery.  These paintings have now been attributed to his brother Jan Brueghel the Elder.

Life
Pieter Brueghel the Younger was born in Brussels, the oldest son of the famous sixteenth-century Netherlandish painter Pieter Brueghel the Elder (known as "Peasant Brueghel") and Mayken Coecke van Aelst. His father died in 1569, when Pieter the younger was only five years old. Following the death of his mother in 1578, Pieter, together with his brother Jan Brueghel the Elder (also referred to as "Velvet Brueghel", "Paradise Breughel" and "Flower Breughel") and sister Marie, went to live with their grandmother Mayken Verhulst. Mayken Verhulst was the widow of the prolific artist Pieter Coecke van Aelst and an accomplished artist in her own right, known for her miniature paintings. According to the early 17th-century Flemish biographer Karel van Mander Mayken Verhulst was possibly the first teacher of her two grandsons.

The Brueghel family moved to Antwerp sometime after 1578 and Pieter possibly entered the studio of the landscape painter Gillis van Coninxloo (1544–1607). His teacher left Antwerp in 1585 and in the 1584/1585 registers of the Guild of Saint Luke, "Peeter Brugel" is listed as an independent master.

On 5 November 1588 Pieter married Elisabeth Goddelet. The couple had seven children, many of whom died young. One son called Pieter Brueghel III was also a painter. Pieter Brueghel the Younger operated a large studio in Antwerp which produced mainly inexpensive copies of his father's work for local sale and export. He was nevertheless often in financial difficulties, possibly due to drinking. He had at least 9 pupils including Frans Snyders and Andries Daniels.

He died in Antwerp, aged 72.

Work

General
Pieter Brueghel the Younger painted landscapes, religious subjects, proverbs, and village scenes. A few flower still-life paintings by Pieter have been recorded. His genre paintings of peasants emphasize the picturesque and are regarded by some as lacking Pieter the Elder's subtlety and humanism.

He and his workshop were prolific copyists of Pieter Bruegel the Elder's most famous compositions. His name and work were largely forgotten in the 18th and 19th centuries until he was rediscovered in the first half of the 20th century.

Original works

Pieter Brueghel the Younger created original works largely in the idiom of his father which are energetic, bold and bright and adapted to the 17th-century style. One of the artist's most successful original designs was the painting of The Village Lawyer (sometimes also called the Tax Collector's Office, the Payment of the Tithe, the Lawyer of Bad Cases and the Notary's Office). The different titles of the work indicate that it may have been interpreted in these different ways in the 17th century. The title The Village Lawyer is probably the best suited since the person behind the desk is wearing a lawyer's bonnet, the collection of taxes usually did not occur in such setting and the paperwork and bags on the desk look like those for requests and decrees. The picture also shows peasants lining up with presents such as chickens and eggs to please the lawyer, which was a common occurrence, whereas tithe payments were made in grain. The painting shows his interest in and close observation of village life. Pieter Brueghel the Younger's workshop made many copies of the composition in different formats. There exist 19 signed and dated versions of this work (from between 1615–22) out of some 25 originals and 35 questionable versions.

Another original composition of Pieter Brueghel the Younger is the Whitsun Bride, which is known in at least five autograph versions. One of the copies was formerly held by the Metropolitan Museum of Art. The picture depicts a Flemish springtime custom of choosing and crowning a queen at Whitsuntide. The festival is focused around a flower gathered in the fields by children. This painting distinguishes itself in style and colour clearly from his father's work. The painting uses bright colours, with much vermilion and a rich blue-green in the figures and blue for the sky. The colours display a unity of tone distinctive of the 17th century. The picture also displays a unity in drawing and composition. Another original composition by Pieter Brueghel the Younger are four small tondos representing the Four Stages of the River (all at the National Gallery in Prague). As his style never evolved from the manner of his early career it is difficult to date his work.

In several cases, it is not clear whether a composition is an original composition by Pieter Brueghel the Younger or a copy after a lost work by his father.

Copyist
Apart from these paintings of his own invention, Pieter Brueghel the Younger also copied the famous compositions of his father through a technique called pouncing. This large scale activity was only possible thanks to his large, well-organized workshop. Comparison of some copies with the originals reveals differences, both in terms of colour as well as the omission or addition of certain details. This may indicate that the copyist re-drafted some sections, or possibly based the copies on prints after original works, rather than on the originals themselves. Pieter the Younger frequently made paintings out of his father's figural designs, including drawings for prints.

As Pieter Brueghel the Younger did not always have access to the original paintings of his father he would in fact often rely on prints of his father's work to create his derived compositions. He also had access to (now lost) compositional drawings and intermediary cartoons which his father had made and then transferred to panels using pouncing. His work is often the only source of knowledge about works of his father that are lost. 

The subjects of the copied works cover the entire range of themes and works by Pieter the Elder, including specific religious compositions on both the grand and the small scale. The principal subjects are proverb and peasant scenes of his father.

One of the most frequently copied works of his father was the Winter Landscape with Skaters and a Bird-trap. This work was reproduced by Pieter Brueghel the Younger and his workshop at least 60 times. Of these copies 10 are signed and 4 are dated (1601, 1603, 1616 and 1626). Another popular work of Pieter the Elder was the Adoration of the Magi in the Snow of which Pieter Brueghel the Younger and his workshop produced about 30 copies.

The workshop also produced no less than 25 copies of Pieter Brueghel the Elder's St John the Baptist Preaching, the original of which is widely believed to be the picture dated 1566, in the Museum of Fine Arts in Budapest. Some of the copies are held in the collections of museums such as the Hermitage, the Royal Museum of Fine Arts in Antwerp, the National Museum in Kraków, the Rheinisches Landesmuseum in Bonn, the Stedelijk Museum Wuyts-Van Campen en Baron Caroly in Lier and the Musée des Beaux-Arts de Valenciennes.  Some of the copies are signed and dated. The quality and the large number of versions produced by Brueghel the Younger suggest that he had first-hand knowledge of his father's original. Scholars have contended that Brueghel the Elder's original picture offered a coded comment on the religious debates that raged in the Low Countries during the 1560s and that it represented a clandestine sermon as held by the Protestant reformers of that time.

Pieter the Younger changed some details of his father's original composition. For instance, some versions omit an unidentified figure of a bearded man in black, who is turned towards the spectator. The omission appears to confirm speculation that his prominent presence in the original composition was not accidental. The distinctive face of this figure suggests that it may be a portrait, possibly of the artist himself or the patron who commissioned the painting. The figure of Christ has often been identified either as the man in grey behind the left arm of the Baptist or the bearded man further to the left with his arms crossed. The continued popularity of the picture a generation after Pieter Brueghel the Elder's death when the subject had not only lost its political implications but ran contrary to the religious current of the time, shows there was a more aesthetic appreciation of the subject. The composition was then likely enjoyed more for its representation of humanity in all its diversity of race, class, temperament and attitude.

The large-scale production of copies of his father's oeuvre demonstrates that there was a significant demand for Pieter the Elder's work. At the same time the copies contributed to the popularisation of Pieter the Elder's idiom.  Without the son's copying work the public would not have had access to his father's work, which was mainly held in elite private collections, such as the imperial collection of Rudolf II in Prague or the Farnese collection in Parma.  At the same time Pieter the Younger extended his father's repertoire through his own inventions and variations on themes by his father.

Selected works

A Country Brawl
A Village Festival
Adoration of the Magi
Census in Bethlehem
Flemish Proverbs
Massacre of the Innocents
Peasant Wedding Dance
Saint John's Dancers in Molenbeeck'''The AlchemistThe CrucifixionThe Faithless ShepherdThe Holy Family with St JohnThe Procession to CalvaryThe Sermon of Saint John the BaptistThe Seven Acts of MercyThe Village LawyerThe Visit to the FarmVillage FairWinter Landscape with a Bird Trap''

Family tree

Notes

References

External links

1560s births
1638 deaths
Flemish Baroque painters
Flemish genre painters
Flemish landscape painters
Pieter 02
Pieter The Younger
Painters from Antwerp
People of the Habsburg Netherlands
16th-century Flemish painters
17th-century Flemish painters